The German federal highway, the Bundesstraße 289 (B 289), runs from Coburg to Rehau in southern Germany.

Bundesstraße 289 branches eastwards from the B 4 south of Coburg near Untersiemau. In its upgraded section from the Coburg's southern motorway junction to the Untersiemau junction on the A 73 (Suhl - Coburg - Nürnberg), the road has two lanes and, on hilly sections, three. The total cost of this six kilometre long section which was called Project Bundesstraße 289n was 26.8 million euros, of which 3.3 million euros was needed to purchase land. The new section was opened to traffic on 5 September 2008. The continuation of the road northwards begins at the Lichtenfels junction. Here it runs to just behind Hochstadt, where it branches east to Kulmbach, together with the B 173.

Until the A 73 motorway was completed the B 289 ran through Untersiemau, Obersiemau, Buch am Forst and Lichtenfels to the Lichtenfels-Ost junction on the B 173.

Kulmbach 
Crossing with the B 85
 Untersteinach 
 Crossing with the B 303
Marktleugast
Münchberg 
Crossing with the B 2 
shortly before the entrance to the village A 9
Weißdorf

to

Rehau, where it ends at the eponymous junction with the A 93.

See also
 List of federal highways in Germany

External links 
 Informationen zum Bau der B 289n vom Straßenbauamt Bamberg

289
Transport in Bavaria